Irina Vladimirovna Kazakevich (born 29 October 1997) is a Russian biathlete. She has competed in the Biathlon World Cup since 2020.

Biathlon results
All results are sourced from the International Biathlon Union.

Olympic Games
1 medal (1 silver)

World Championships

References

External links

1997 births
Living people
People from Novosibirsk Oblast
Russian female biathletes
Universiade medalists in biathlon
Universiade silver medalists for Russia
Competitors at the 2019 Winter Universiade
Biathletes at the 2022 Winter Olympics
Medalists at the 2022 Winter Olympics
Olympic silver medalists for the Russian Olympic Committee athletes
Olympic medalists in biathlon
Olympic biathletes of Russia
Sportspeople from Novosibirsk Oblast
21st-century Russian women